The Bushveld Sandstone is a geological formation dating to roughly between 201 and 189 million years ago and covering the Carnian to Norian stages. The Bushveld Sandstone is found in Transvaal, South Africa and is a member of the Stormberg Group. As its name suggests, it consists mainly of sandstone. Fossils of the prosauropod dinosaur Massospondylus have been recovered from the Bushveld Sandstone.

The Bushveld Sandstone was thought to be Late Triassic age, but was considered to be temporally correlative to the Clarens Formation by Smith et al. (1993).

Vertebrate fauna 
Dinosaur tracks located in Transvaal.

See also 
 List of dinosaur-bearing rock formations
 List of fossiliferous stratigraphic units in South Africa
 Clarens Formation

References 

Geologic formations of South Africa
Stormberg Group
Jurassic System of Africa
Jurassic South Africa
Hettangian Stage
Sinemurian Stage
Sandstone formations
Ichnofossiliferous formations
Paleontology in South Africa